Mystery Island is a 1977–78 American children's science-fiction television programme.

Mystery Island may also refer to:
Mystery Island (Vanuatu), officially Inyeug Island, a small uninhabited island belonging to Vanuatu
Mystery Island (1937 film), an Australian film
Mystery Island (1966 film), a film made by combining two episodes of The Baron
Mystery Island (book), 1944 Enid Blyton children's novel
"Mystery Island", a song by Status Quo from the 2013 album Bula Quo!

See also
 Mystery Islands 2006 trance music EP by Jani Kervinen
 Manhunt of Mystery Island, 1945 American movie serial
 Kidnapped to Mystery Island, 1964 German–Italian film
 Mysterious Island (disambiguation)